Kordenab (also Romanized as Kordenāb; also known as Gordāb, Kirdahnu, Kirdakhnu, and Kordeh Nāb) is a village in Guzal Darreh Rural District, Soltaniyeh District, Abhar County, Zanjan Province, Iran. At the 2006 census, its population was 309, in 63 families.

References 

Populated places in Abhar County